Adam and Eve is a 1928 German silent comedy film directed by Rudolf Biebrach and starring Reinhold Schünzel, Elza Temary and Valerie Boothby. It was shot at the Babelsberg Studios in Berlin and on location in the Giant Mountains. The film's sets were designed by the art directors Arthur Schwarz and Julius von Borsody.

Synopsis
Adam and his girlfriend Anna work as a gardener and maid in a house and are devoted to each other. However the arrival of a new maid, the vampish Klara comes between them as she makes a strong play for Adam's affections.

Cast
Reinhold Schünzel as Adam Grünau
Elza Temary as Anna, das Hausmädchen
Valerie Boothby as Klara, die Zofe
Hermine Sterler as Frau Konsul Jensen
Trude Lehmann as Cook
Hugo Werner-Kahle as Diener
Ernst Hofmann as Sohn
John Loder
John Mylong as Chauffeur
Meta Jäger as Adams Mutter
Frigga Braut as Forester

References

External links

Films of the Weimar Republic
German silent feature films
Films directed by Rudolf Biebrach
UFA GmbH films
German black-and-white films
German comedy films
Silent comedy films
1920s German films
Films shot at Babelsberg Studios